Nizam-ul-Mulk may refer to:

 Qamar-ud-din Khan, Asaf Jah I, a Mughal nobleman who founded the Hyderabad State in India
 Nizam of Hyderabad, a former monarch of the Hyderabad State
 Nizam al-Mulk (1018–1092), a Persian scholar and vizier of the Seljuq Empire